Washir (Vashir) is a village located at  at 1,155 m altitude in a hilly area. It is the district center of Washir District, Helmand Province, Afghanistan.

See also
 Helmand Province

Populated places in Helmand Province